Anne Catherine Dyer (born February 1957) is a British Anglican bishop, previously a rector and an academic administrator.

In 2018, she became Bishop of Aberdeen and Orkney in the Scottish Episcopal Church. Subject to a report process, with a recommendation that she step aside permanently, then mediation, she was briefly suspended from office on 10 August 2022 after allegations of misconduct were made against her. Her appeal against suspension failed, and she is, as of mid October, going through a church grievance and disciplinary process.

Previously, from 2005 to 2011, she was the Warden of Cranmer Hall, Durham, a theological college of the Church of England. Then, she was Rector of Holy Trinity Church, Haddington, East Lothian in the Diocese of Edinburgh (in the Scottish Episcopal Church) between 2011 and 2018.

Early life and education
Dyer was born in February 1957 in Bradford, Yorkshire, England. She was educated at Bradford Girls' Grammar School, an all-girls private school. She studied chemistry at St Anne's College, Oxford, graduating with a Bachelor of Arts (BA) degree: as per tradition, her BA was later promoted to a Master of Arts (MA Oxon) degree. She then worked as a business analyst/systems analyst at Unilever.

In 1984, Dyer entered Wycliffe Hall, Oxford, an Evangelical Anglican theological college, to train for ordained ministry. During this time, she also studied theology. She left theological college in 1987 to be ordained in the Church of England. She continued her theological studies, and completed a Master of Theology (MTh) degree at King's College, London in 1989.

Ordained ministry
Dyer was ordained in the Church of England as a deacon in 1987 and as a priest in 1994. All Dyer's parish ministry in the Church of England was spent in the Diocese of Rochester. While she continued her studies, she held two non-stipendiary minister (NSM) appointments: at St John's Church, Eden Park (1987 to 1988), and at St George's Church, Beckenham (1988 to 1989). From 1989 to 1994, she was parish deacon of Christ Church, Luton. In 1993, she was appointed an associate adviser in evangelism for the diocese. From 1994 to 1998, she was also an NSM of St Barnabas' Church, Istead Rise. Then, from 1998 to 2004, she was the Ministry Development Officer for the Diocese of Rochester. In 2000, she was appointed an Honorary Canon of Rochester Cathedral.

In August 2004, Dyer was announced as the next Warden of Cranmer Hall, Durham. Cranmer Hall is an evangelical Anglican theological college that forms part of St John's College, Durham University. In January 2005, she took up the appointment following her licensing by the Bishop of Durham (Tom Wright). In 2008, she was appointed an honorary canon of Durham Cathedral. She stepped down as warden in 2011, and was succeeded by Mark Tanner.

In 2011, Dyer moved to the Scottish Episcopal Church, having been appointed rector of Holy Trinity Church, Haddington, East Lothian in the Diocese of Edinburgh. Since 2015, she has also been a member of the council of the Scottish Episcopal Institute, the Scottish Episcopal Church's theological college.

Episcopal Ministry
On 9 November 2017, Dyer was selected as the next Bishop of Aberdeen and Orkney, making her the first woman to have become a bishop in the Scottish Episcopal Church. Her selection caused controversy due to her gender, support of same-sex marriage, and that she was not elected by the diocese itself (she was appointed by the house of Bishops after the diocese failed to choose its own bishop). Two senior clergy in the diocese resigned their diocesan roles in protest, including Emsley Nimmo, the dean of the Diocese of Aberdeen and Orkney. She was consecrated a bishop on 1 March 2018 during a service at St Andrew's Cathedral, Aberdeen.

Allegations of Bullying and Investigation

In February 2021, Dyer was accused of bullying by a number of clergy, laypeople and church employees in The Times. In March 2021, the College of Bishops commissioned Iain Torrance to lead an Independent Review into "difficulties" in the Diocese following a series of allegations regarding the Bishop. In August 2021 the College of Bishops announced their intention to defer publication of the report and move to a second stage of reviewing.

A few days later The Times reported Torrance's findings which had taken evidence from over 100 people. His report, which Dyer tried to have changed after completion, found that there was a culture of bullying and "systematic dysfunction in the diocese", and that there were previous similar problems in Dyer's time at Durham. Professor Torrance stated that: "Without colluding in what I much fear is a repetition of the past, I cannot recommend the continuation of a tenure in which I fear that more people will be made to feel diminished and discouraged." He recommended that Dyer be immediately sent on sabbatical and that she should step down from her position permanently.

However, the bishops decided, instead, to establish a mediation process. Dyer has stated that she  herself had been a victim of bullying, that the diocese was "not well", and that "The mediation process being offered to our diocese is our treatment".

On 10 August 2022, Dyer was suspended as bishop after the SEC announced they had received two complaints of bullying. On 23 August, an Episcopal Synod (meeting of bishops) was held to decide procedure for the appeal: they decided to meet in private, and adjourned until 5 September, and later rescheduled. The Episcopal Synod finally met on 30 September, voting 3 to 2 to refuse the appeal and continue Dyer's suspension from office. The church stated that "The suspension does not constitute disciplinary action and does not imply any assumption that misconduct has been committed".

Views
Dyer identifies with the Open Evangelical tradition of Anglicanism.

In December 2014, Dyer signed an open letter to the bishops of the Scottish Episcopal Church that was supportive of same-sex marriage: it concluded with a "wish to make clear our continuing commitment to affirm and support all people in our church, and to recognise and rejoice in all marriages, of whatever sexual orientation, as true signs of the love of God in Christ." With the SEC voting to allow same-sex marriages, she conducted her first such marriage in October 2017.

Personal life
Dyer is married to Roger. Together they had one child, a daughter, who died, aged 30, in November 2021.

References

1957 births
Living people
20th-century English Anglican priests
Staff of Cranmer Hall, Durham
Alumni of St Anne's College, Oxford
Alumni of Wycliffe Hall, Oxford
Alumni of King's College London
People educated at Bradford Girls' Grammar School
Women Anglican bishops
Bishops of Aberdeen and Orkney
Academics of Durham University